Grande Yellowhead Public School Division  (GYPSD) is a public school board that serves the Yellowhead County. GYPSD operates schools in Evansburg, Wildwood, Niton, Fulham, Edson, Hinton, Grande Cache, Jasper as well as rural schools in the area. The division's name was originally called Grande Yellowhead Regional Division No. 35 until it was changed to Grande Yellowhead Public School Division No. 77 in 2009.

Schools
Edson
 Fulham School (K-6)
 Mary Bergeron Elementary School (K-5)
 Parkland Composite High School (9-12 English, French)
 École Pine Grove Middle School (6-8 English, French)
 Ecole Westhaven Elementary School (K-5 English, French)

Hinton
 Crescent Valley Elementary School (K-7)
 Harry Collinge High School (8-12 English, French)
 Ecole Mountain View Elementary School (K-7 English, French)

Jasper
 Ecole Jasper Elementary School (K-6 English, French)
 Jasper Junior Senior High School (7-12)

Grande Cache
 Grande Cache Community High School (9-12)
 Sheldon Coates Elementary School (K-3)
 Summitview School (4-8)

Lobstick
 Evansview School (K-6)
 Grand Trunk High School (7-12)
 Niton Central School (K-9)
 Wildwood School (K-6)

References

External links
Grande Yellowhead Public School Division No. 77

School districts in Alberta